Ángel Ganivet García (13 December 1865 in Granada, Spain – 29 November 1898 in Riga) was a Spanish writer and diplomat. He was considered a precursor to the Generation of '98.

On 29 November 1898, disillusioned in love, Ganivet drowned himself in the Daugava River. Nearly failing in his attempt, he was first rescued but managed to throw himself into the river again. Ganivet had contemplated suicide for several years, and he had suffered from progressive syphilitic paralysis.

Some of his works

 Granada la bella. (1896) (Granada the Beautiful)
 Idearium español. (1897) (literally, Spanish Idearium, also translated as Spain, an Interpretation)
 La conquista del reino de Maya, por el último conquistador español, Pío Cid (1897) (The Conquest of the Mayan Kingdom, by the Last Spanish Conqueror, Pío Cid)
 Cartas finlandesas. (1898) (Finnish Letters, also translated into Finnish as Suomalaiskirjeitä)
 El escultor de su alma. (1906) (The Sculptor of Your Soul)

References
 

1865 births
1898 deaths
Spanish male poets
19th-century poets
19th-century male writers
1890s suicides
Suicides by drowning
Russia–Spain relations
Finland–Spain relations
Lithuania–Spain relations